St. Petro Mohyla Institute is a student residence founded in 1916 by the Ukrainian community of Saskatchewan.

The original mandate of Mohyla Institute was to provide housing and cultural programs for Ukrainian-Canadian students to promote the preservation of Ukrainian culture in the Canadian diaspora. Mohyla Institute has since become a residence for post-secondary students of all nationalities and backgrounds, while still focusing on the preservation of Ukrainian culture in Saskatchewan.

Mohyla Institute is a home away from home for residents including those of Ukrainian ancestry, and for students throughout Canada and abroad. The residence is open to all students pursuing post-secondary education at various institutions throughout Saskatoon. Due to the institute's close proximity to the University of Saskatchewan, the majority of residents are enrolled at the university in a variety of programs.

Mohyla Institute continues to honor its Ukrainian roots by providing space for Ukrainian organizations. Mohyla has been a long-time supporter of Saskatoon's Orthodox Ukrainian Youth Choir Lastiwka, who call the institute home. Mohyla also offers a Ukrainian language immersion program for high school students in the summer months to continue the mandate of its founders to preserve Ukrainian language and culture. Mohyla Institute is very involved in the Ukrainian community in Saskatchewan, as well as throughout Canada.

History 
 
The institute was founded in 1916, and named after the Ukrainian Orthodox Metropolitan, St. Petro Mohyla. Later the institute moved from its original location on Main Street to its current address at 1240 Temperance Street in the 1960s.

See also 
Ukrainian Orthodox Church of Canada
Ukrainian Canadian

References

All facts, unless otherwise stated, are from St. Petro Mohyla Institute's website.

External links 
St. Petro Mohyla Institute
Ukrainian Orthodox Church of Canada
Lastiwka Ukrainian Orthodox Youth Choir
Ukrainian Canadian Congress - Saskatchewan

Ukrainian-Canadian culture in Saskatchewan
Educational institutions established in 1916
1916 establishments in Canada